Tutanota is an end-to-end encrypted email app and a freemium secure email service. The service is advertisement-free; it relies on donations and premium subscriptions. As of March 2017, Tutanota's owners claimed to have over 2 million users of the product.

History
Tutanota is derived from Latin and contains the words "tuta" and "nota" which means "secure message". Tutao GmbH was founded in 2011 in Hannover, Germany.

The goal of the developers for Tutanota is to fight for email privacy. Their vision gained even more importance, when Edward Snowden revealed NSA's mass surveillance programs like XKeyscore in July 2013.

Since 2014, the software has been open-sourced and can be reviewed by outsiders on GitHub.

In August 2018, Tutanota became the first email service provider to release their app on F-Droid, removing all dependence on proprietary code. This was part of a full remake of the app, which removed dependence on GCM for notifications by replacing it with SSE. The new app also enabled search, 2FA and got a new reworked user interface. 

In November 2020, the Cologne court ordered monitoring of a single Tutanota account that had been used for an extortion attempt. The monitoring function should only apply to future unencrypted emails this account receives and it will not affect emails previously received.

Encryption
Tutanota offers end-to-end encryption for emails sent from one Tutanota user to another. Tutanota also encrypts all emails and contacts stored in their servers, "except for email addresses of users as well as senders and recipients of emails" and "date of an email sent or received". Emails sent non-encrypted, are encrypted only between the Tutanota user and Tutanota servers, and then sent unencrypted to destination user.

Tutanota uses a standardized, hybrid method consisting of a symmetrical and an asymmetrical algorithm - AES with a length of 128 bit and RSA with 2048 bit. To external recipients who do not use Tutanota a notification is sent with a link to a temporary Tutanota account. After entering a previously exchanged password, the recipient can read the message and reply end-to-end encrypted.

Account deletion 
Tutanota deletes free accounts that have not been logged into for 6 months. According to Tutanota, this happens because of security reasons and for keeping the service free.

Tutanota has also been GDPR compliant since 2018.

Censorship 
Tutanota has been blocked in Egypt since October 2019, and blocked in Russia since February 2020 for unknown reasons (although believed to be tied to recent actions against services operating outside of the country, especially those that involve encrypted communications).

Although Tutanota has been blocked in these countries, users still access its service via Tor or VPN.

See also

 Comparison of mail servers
 Comparison of webmail providers

References

External links
 

Cross-platform software
Free security software
Free software webmail
Internet properties established in 2011
Secure communication
Software using the GPL license